Astylosternus perreti, also known as Perret's night frog is a species of frog in the family Arthroleptidae. It is one of the few species of African frogs to have claws, used on demand, when it feels threatened.

Etymology
The specific name perreti honours , a Swiss herpetologist who has specialized in African amphibians.

Habitat and conservation
Its natural habitats are lower montane and submontane forests, often in very steep terrain close to torrents. It lives in or near flowing water. It is threatened by severe habitat loss.

References

External links

perreti
Frogs of Africa
Amphibians of Cameroon
Endemic fauna of Cameroon
Amphibians described in 1978
Taxonomy articles created by Polbot
Taxa named by Jean-Louis Amiet
Fauna of the Cameroonian Highlands forests